Michael Fagan (born 8 August 1948) is a British citizen who intruded into Queen Elizabeth II's bedroom in Buckingham Palace in 1982.

Early life
Michael Fagan was born in Clerkenwell, London, on 8 August 1948, the son of Ivy and Michael Fagan, Sr. His father was a steel erector and a "champion" safe-breaker. He had two younger sisters, Marjorie and Elizabeth. In 1955, he attended Compton Street School in Clerkenwell (later St Peter & St Paul RC Primary School). In 1966, he left home at 18 to escape his father, who, Fagan says, was violent. He started working as a painter and decorator. In 1972, he married Christine, with whom he had four children (she left him the year of the break-ins, but later came back). At some point in the 1970s–1980s, Fagan was a member of a North London branch of the Workers Revolutionary Party.

Break-ins

First entry

In early July 1982, Fagan intruded into Buckingham Palace. He stated that he shimmied up a drainpipe and startled a housemaid, who called security. He disappeared before guards arrived, who then disbelieved the housemaid's report. Fagan said he then entered the palace through an unlocked window on the roof and wandered around for the next half-hour while eating cheese and crackers. Three alarms in total were tripped, but the police turned them off, believing they were faulty. He viewed royal portraits and sat for some time on a throne. He also spoke of entering the post room. He drank a half bottle of white wine, became tired and left.

Second entry
At around 7:00 a.m. on 9 July 1982, Fagan scaled Buckingham Palace's  perimeter wall, which was topped with revolving spikes and barbed wire, and climbed up a drainpipe. An alarm sensor detected his movements, but police thought the alarm was faulty and silenced it. Fagan wandered the corridors for several minutes before reaching the royal apartments. In an anteroom, Fagan broke a glass ashtray, cutting his hand. He entered the bedroom of Queen Elizabeth II at about 7:15 am carrying a fragment of glass.

The Queen woke when Fagan disturbed a curtain. Initial reports said he had sat on the edge of her bed; however, Fagan said in a 2012 interview that the Queen left the room immediately to seek security. The Queen phoned the palace switchboard twice for police, but none arrived, so she used her bedside alarm bell; she also beckoned a housemaid in the corridor, who was quickly dispatched to seek urgent help. The duty footman, Paul Whybrew, who had been walking the Queen's dogs, arrived, followed by two policemen on palace duty, who removed Fagan. The incident had happened as the armed police officer outside the royal bedroom came off duty before his replacement arrived.

A subsequent police report was critical of the competence of officers on duty, as well as a system of confused and divided command. The Home Secretary, who held sole responsibility for the police, William Whitelaw, offered his resignation but it was refused by the prime minister, Margaret Thatcher.

Arrest
Since Fagan's actions were, at the time, a civil wrong rather than a criminal offence, he was not charged with trespassing in the Queen's bedroom. He was charged with theft of the wine, but the charges were dropped when he was committed for psychiatric evaluation. In late July, Fagan's mother said, "He thinks so much of the Queen. I can imagine him just wanting to simply talk and say hello and discuss his problems." He spent the next three months in a psychiatric hospital before being released on 21 January 1983.

It was not until 2007, when Buckingham Palace became a "designated site" for the purposes of section 128 of the Serious Organised Crime and Police Act 2005, that trespass at the palace became a criminal offence.

Later life
Two years after entering Buckingham Palace, Fagan attacked a policeman at a café in Fishguard, Wales, and was given a three-month suspended sentence. In 1983, Fagan recorded a cover version of the Sex Pistols song "God Save the Queen" with punk band the Bollock Brothers. In 1997, he was imprisoned for four years after he, his wife and their 20-year-old son Arran were charged with conspiring to supply heroin.

Fagan made an appearance in Channel 4's The Antics Roadshow, an hour-long 2011 TV documentary directed by the artist Banksy and Jaimie D'Cruz charting the history of people behaving oddly in public.

After the death of the Queen on 8 September 2022, Fagan told reporters that he had lit a candle in her memory at a local church.

In fiction
The intrusion was adapted in 2012 for an episode of Sky Arts' Playhouse Presents series entitled "Walking the Dogs", a one-off British comedy drama featuring Emma Thompson as the Queen and Eddie Marsan as the intruder. In 2020, Tom Brooke played Fagan in the fifth episode of season 4 of The Crown. The intrusion also inspired Trinidadian calypso singer Mighty Sparrow to write his ironic song "Phillip My Dear", very loosely based on the event.

See also

 The boy Jones, serial intruder to Buckingham Palace in the 1800s
 The BFG, 1983 children's novel in which the protagonist Sophie intrudes into the Queen's bedroom

References

1948 births
1982 in London
1980s crimes in London
1980s in the City of Westminster
20th-century English criminals
Buckingham Palace
Criminals from London
English male criminals
July 1982 events in the United Kingdom
Living people
People from Clerkenwell
Workers Revolutionary Party (UK) members